Sébastien Heitzmann (born 11 September 1979) is a French retired football striker who last played for Amiens SC.

References

1979 births
Living people
French footballers
AJ Auxerre players
Louhans-Cuiseaux FC players
AS Beauvais Oise players
Stade de Reims players
Dijon FCO players
Valenciennes FC players
Amiens SC players
Ligue 1 players
Ligue 2 players
Footballers from Lyon
Association football forwards